Rugby Club Salon XIII, nicknamed the Jaguars, are a French Rugby league club based in Salon-de-Provence, Bouches-du-Rhône in the Provence-Alpes-Côte d'Azur region. The club plays in the French Elite Two Championship.

History 

Founded in 1947 RC Salon lifted their first silverware in 1959 when they won the National 2 (now called National Division 1)  title beating Le Soler in the final 21-10. It would be another 17 years before another trophy was won and once again it was the National 2 league title this time following a 13-2 win against US Entraigues XIII . After promotion to the 2nd tier the club became a permanent if not a successful club in the Elite Two Championship. Until that is the mid nineties when from nowhere the club won back to back titles. In 95/96 they beat Tonneins XIII 30-16 and the following season they beat Saint-Cyprien 34-8. The club is currently back playing in the 3rd tier. In season 2016/17 they finished top of the National Division 1 East league.

Current squad 
Squad for 2022-23 Season;

Honours 

 Elite Two Championship (2): 1995-96, 1996–97
 National 2 (National Division 1) (2): 1958-59, 1975–76

References

External links

French rugby league teams
1947 establishments in France
Rugby clubs established in 1947